The 2018–19 North Carolina Tar Heels women's basketball team represents the University of North Carolina at Chapel Hill during the 2018–19 NCAA Division I women's basketball season. The Tar Heels, led by thirty-third year head coach Sylvia Hatchell, play their games at Carmichael Arena and are members of the Atlantic Coast Conference. They finished the season 18–15, 9–9 in ACC play to finish in eighth place. They defeat Georgia Tech in the first round before losing in the second round of the ACC women's tournament to Notre Dame. They received an at-large bid to the NCAA women's tournament, which was their first trip since 2015. They lost in the first round to California.

On April 18, Hatchell resigned after an external review confirmed reports that she had made racially insensitive comments and mismanaged players' medical issues. Hatchell, the only coach with national titles in the AIAW, NAIA, and NCAA, left Chapel Hill with 1,023 wins overall and 751 in 33 seasons with the Tar Heels, including the 1994 NCAA title. The school tabbed Princeton's Courtney Banghart as their new head coach on April 29, officially announcing her the next day.

Previous season
For the 2017–18 season, the Tar Heelss finished 15–16 overall and 4–12 in ACC play which was 12th place.  North Carolina was eliminated in the second round of the ACC tournament by North Carolina State. The Tar Heels were not invited to post-season play

Off-season

Recruiting Class

Source:

Roster

Schedule

|-
!colspan=9 style="background:#56A0D3; color:#FFFFFF;"|Exhibition

|-
!colspan=9 style="background:#56A0D3; color:#FFFFFF;"| Non-conference regular season

|-
!colspan=9 style="background:#56A0D3; color:#FFFFFF;"| ACC regular season

|-
!colspan=9 style="background:#56A0D3;"| ACC Women's tournament

|-
!colspan=9 style="background:#56A0D3;"| NCAA Women's tournament

Source

Rankings

^Coaches did not release a Week 2 poll.

See also
2018–19 North Carolina Tar Heels men's basketball team

References

North Carolina Tar Heels women's basketball seasons
North Carolina
North Carolina women's basketball
North Carolina women's basketball
North Carolina